Melbourne is a city and county seat of Izard County, Arkansas, United States.  The population was 1,848 at the 2010 census.  It is home to the main campus of Ozarka College.

Geography

List of highways 

 Arkansas Highway 9
 Arkansas Highway 69

Demographics

2020 census

As of the 2020 United States census, there were 1,830 people, 836 households, and 422 families residing in the city.

2010 census
At the 2010 census there were 1,848 people in 787 households, including 476 families, in the city. The racial makeup of the city was 97.55% White, 0.36% Native American, 0.18% Asian, 0.42% from other races, and 1.49% from two or more races. Hispanic or Latino of any race were 0.60%.

Of the 736 households 25.8% had children under the age of 18 living with them, 45.1% were married couples living together, 13.3% had a female householder with no husband present, and 39.0% were non-families. 35.3% of households were one person and 17.4% were one person aged 65 or older.  The average household size was 2.15 and the average family size was 2.78.

The age distribution was 21.9% under the age of 18, 9.9% from 18 to 24, 24.4% from 25 to 44, 22.7% from 45 to 64, and 21.2% 65 or older.  The median age was 40 years. For every 100 females, there were 83.2 males.  For every 100 females age 18 and over, there were 76.5 males.

The median household income was $22,757 and the median family income  was $31,900. Males had a median income of $23,529 versus $18,264 for females. The per capita income for the city was $13,110.  About 14.5% of families and 18.4% of the population were below the poverty line, including 25.9% of those under age 18 and 21.9% of those age 65 or over.

Education 
Public education for elementary and secondary school students is available from Melbourne School District, which leads students to graduate from Melbourne High School. The school's athletic emblem and mascot is the Bearkatz.

Notable people
Michelle Gray - Republican member of the Arkansas House of Representatives for District 62; resident with her husband, Dr. Adam Gray, of Melbourne
Glen D. Johnson - Member of the United States House of Representatives for Oklahoma's 4th congressional district; born in Melbourne, died 1983

Gallery

References

Cities in Izard County, Arkansas
Cities in Arkansas
County seats in Arkansas